This list of European television awards is an index to articles about notable awards for contributions in various fields of television in Europe. The list gives the home country of the organization that grants the awards, although the awards are not necessarily restricted to television in that country.

The countries are organized by region following the United Nations geoscheme for Europe, as shown below:

General

Western Europe

Southern Europe

Eastern Europe

Northern Europe

See also

 List of television awards

References

Europe